Governor Parnell may refer to:

Harvey Parnell (1880–1936), 29th Governor of Arkansas
Sean Parnell (born 1962), 10th Governor of Alaska